Thomas Gisborne (died 1806) was President of the College of Physicians in 1791, 1794 and from 1796 to 1803.

References

1806 deaths
Presidents of the Royal College of Physicians